Consumer Financial Protection Bureau v. Community Financial Services Association of America, Limited (Docket 22–448) is a pending United States Supreme Court case related to the Consumer Financial Protection Bureau's funding mechanism.

Background 

The Consumer Financial Protection Bureau was created after the financial crisis of 2007–2008 as part of the Dodd–Frank Wall Street Reform and Consumer Protection Act. Its structure included a director that could not be fired by the President except for cause, and the ability to request funding from the Federal Reserve rather than the United States Congress. In Seila Law LLC v. Consumer Financial Protection Bureau (2020), the Supreme Court of the United States held the CFPB director's removal protections were unconstitutional.

The Community Financial Services Association of America, a trade group for the payday lending industry, filed a lawsuit in 2018 challenging a CFPB rule restricting payday lending. The United States District Court for the Western District of Texas upheld the rule. The CFSAA appealed to the United States Court of Appeals for the Fifth Circuit, which in October 2022 upheld the rule against an Administrative Procedure Act challenge, but held it must be vacated because it was created when the agency was funded by the Federal Reserve. The Fifth Circuit held this funding mechanism was unconstitutional.

Supreme Court 

Less than a month after the Fifth Circuit decided the case, the CFPB filed a petition for a writ of certiorari at the Supreme Court, and the Biden administration asked for the Supreme Court to "fast track" the case to be heard during the current 2022 Supreme Court term. The Supreme Court granted certiorari on February 27, 2023.

References

External links 
 

2023 in United States case law
United States Supreme Court cases
United States Supreme Court cases of the Roberts Court
United States Constitution Article One case law
United States separation of powers case law
Consumer Financial Protection Bureau